Advanced Placement (AP) is a program in the United States and Canada created by the College Board. AP offers undergraduate university-level curricula and examinations to high school students. Colleges and universities in the US and elsewhere may grant placement and course credit to students who obtain high scores on the examinations. The AP curriculum for each of the various subjects is created for the College Board by a panel of experts and college-level educators in that academic discipline. For a high school course to have the designation, the course must be audited by the College Board to ascertain that it satisfies the AP curriculum as specified in the Board's Course and Examination Description (CED). If the course is approved, the school may use the AP designation and the course will be publicly listed on the AP Course Ledger.

History
After the end of World War II, the Ford Foundation created a fund that supported committees studying education. The program, which was then referred to as the "Kenyon Plan", was founded and pioneered at Kenyon College in Gambier, Ohio, by the then-college president Gordon Chalmers. The first study was conducted by four prep schools—the Lawrenceville School, Phillips Academy, Phillips Exeter Academy, and St. Paul's School —and three universities—Harvard University, Princeton University and Yale University. In 1952 they issued the report General Education in School and College: A Committee Report which recommended allowing high school seniors to study college-level material and to take achievement exams that allowed them to attain college credit for this work. The second committee, the Committee on Admission with Advanced Standing, developed and implemented the plan to choose a curriculum. A pilot program was run in 1952 which covered eleven disciplines. In the 1955–56 school year, it was nationally implemented in ten subjects: Mathematics, Physics, Chemistry, Biology, English, History, French, German, Spanish, and Latin.

The College Board, a non-profit organization based in New York City, has run the AP program since 1955. From 1965 to 1989, Harlan Hanson was the director of the Advanced Placement Program. It develops and maintains guidelines for the teaching of higher-level courses in various subject areas. In addition, it supports teachers of AP courses and supports universities. These activities are funded through fees required to take the AP exams.

In 2006, over one million students took over two million Advanced Placement examinations. Many high schools in the United States offer AP courses, though the College Board allows any student to take any examination regardless of participation in its respective course. Therefore, home-schooled students and students from schools that do not offer AP courses have an equal opportunity to take AP exams.

As of the 2023 testing season, exams cost $97 each, though the cost may be subsidized by local or state programs. Financial aid is available for students who qualify for it; the exam reduction is $35 per exam from College Board plus an additional $9 rebate per fee-reduced exam from the school. There may be further reductions depending on the state. Out of the $97, $8 goes directly to the school to pay for the administration of the test, which some schools will reduce to lower the cost to the student.

On April 3, 2008, the College Board announced that four AP courses—French Literature, Latin Literature, Computer Science AB, and Italian Language and Culture—would be discontinued after the 2008–2009 school year due to lack of funding. However, the Italian Language and Culture test was again offered beginning in 2011.

Starting July 2013 AP allowed students for the first time to both view and send their scores online.

The number of AP exams administered each year has seen a steady increase over the past decade. In 2003, 175,860 English Language and Composition exams were administered. By 2013, this number had risen to 476,277, or an increase of 171%. Such an increase has occurred in nearly all AP exams offered, with the AP Psychology exam seeing a 281% increase over the past decade. In 2017, the most taken AP exam was English Language and Composition with 579,426 students and the least taken AP exam was Japanese Language and Culture with 2,429 students.

In the 2022-2023 school year, College Board launched a pilot AP African-American Studies course, which is the first new AP course since 2014. The course is acknowledged credit at about 35 colleges, from Virginia Tech to Tuskegee University.

The AP exams begin on the first Monday in May and last ten school days (two weeks).

Scoring
AP tests are scored on a 1 to 5 scale as follows:

5 – Extremely well qualified
4 – Well qualified
3 – Qualified
2 – Possibly qualified
1 – No recommendation
The multiple-choice component of the exam is scored by computer, while the free-response and essay portions are scored by trained Readers at the AP Reading each June. The scores on various components are weighted and combined into a raw Composite Score. The Chief Reader for each exam then decides on the grade cutoffs for that year's exam, which determine how the Composite Scores are converted into the final grades. During the process, a number of reviews and statistical analyses are performed to ensure that the grading is reliable. The overall goal is for the grades to reflect an absolute scale of performance which can be compared from year to year.

Some colleges use AP test scores to exempt students from introductory coursework, others use them to place students in higher designated courses, and some do both. Each college's policy is different, but most require a minimum score of 3 or 4 to receive college credit. Typically, this appears as a "CR" grade on the college transcript, although some colleges and universities will award an A grade for a 5 score. Some countries, such as Germany, that do not offer general admission to their universities and colleges for holders of an American high school diploma without preparatory courses will directly admit students who have completed a specific set of AP tests, depending on the subject they wish to study there.

In addition, completing AP courses helps students qualify for various types of scholarships. According to the College Board, 31 percent of colleges and universities look at AP experience when making scholarship decisions.

Beginning with the May 2011 AP Exam administration, the College Board changed the scoring method of AP Exams. Total scores on the multiple-choice section are now based on the number of questions answered correctly. Points are no longer deducted for incorrect answers and, as was the case before, no points are awarded for unanswered questions. However, scoring requirements have also been increased.

Score reporting
Starting with the May 2013 AP Examination Administration, the College Board launched an Internet-based score reporting service. Students can use their 2013 AP Number or Student Number (if one was indicated) along with a College Board Account to access current and previous years' exam scores. This system can also be used to send scores to colleges and universities for which a four-digit institutional code is assigned.

Exam subsidies

Recognizing that the cost could be an impediment to students of limited means, a number of states and municipalities independent of the College Board have partially or fully subsidized the cost. The state of Florida reimburses school districts for the exam costs of students enrolled in Advanced Placement courses. The Los Angeles Unified School District, the Montebello Unified School District, the Hawaii Department of Education, New York City Department of Education, and the state of Indiana subsidize Examination fees in subjects of math, science, and English, and the Edmonds School District in suburban Seattle currently subsidizes Advanced Placement fees of students who enroll in the free school lunch program. Some school districts, such as Fairfax County Public Schools, will fully cover the cost of a limited number of exams, after which point the student must pay. In addition, some school districts offer free tests to all students enrolled in any Advanced Placement class.

Courses
There are currently 37 courses and exams available through the AP Program.

Arts
AP 2-D Art and Design
AP 3-D Art and Design
AP Drawing
AP Art History
AP Music Theory
English
AP English Language and Composition
AP English Literature and Composition
History and Social Sciences
AP Comparative Government and Politics
AP European History
AP Human Geography
AP Macroeconomics
AP Microeconomics
AP Psychology
AP United States Government and Politics
AP United States History
AP World History: Modern
Math and Computer Science
AP Precalculus
AP Computer Science A
AP Computer Science Principles
AP Calculus AB
AP Calculus BC
AP Statistics
Sciences
AP Biology
AP Chemistry
AP Environmental Science
AP Physics 1: Algebra-Based
AP Physics 2: Algebra-Based
AP Physics C: Electricity and Magnetism
AP Physics C: Mechanics
World Languages and Cultures
AP Chinese Language and Culture
AP French Language and Culture
AP German Language and Culture
AP Italian Language and Culture
AP Japanese Language and Culture
AP Latin
AP Spanish Language and Culture
AP Spanish Literature and Culture

Recent and upcoming exam changes

2016–2017 
 AP World History

 This exam will also undergo the same basic changes to the 2014-2015 United States History and 2015-2016 European History exams.
 Shortened multiple-choice section with 55 questions, accounting for 40% of the total exam score. These are reduced from 70 questions and 50% in previous years, respectively.
 Four short-answer questions in place of one of the long essays, accounting for 20% of the total exam score. These questions are given a 50-minute writing period.
 Document-based question (DBQ) and the remaining long essay now account for 25% and 15% of the exam score respectively. New writing periods of 55 minutes and 35 minutes respectively are given instead of the combined 120-minute writing period for all three essays in previous exams.
AP Calculus AB
Time format changed
Addition of L'Hôpital's rule
AP Calculus BC
Addition of limit comparison tests, absolute and conditional convergence, and the alternating series.

2018–2019 
 AP United States Government and Politics
 Section I (MCQ) will be extended from 60 questions in 45 minutes to 55 questions in 80 minutes. It will still count towards 50% of the total exam score.
 The questions will feature greater use of scenarios and stimulus material.
 The number of answer choices for each question will be reduced from five to four.
 Section II (FRQ) will include four questions in 100 minutes (the same amount of questions and time as the previous exams). The section as a whole will be worth 50% of the total exam score. All four questions are weighted equally (each is worth 12.5% of the total exam score). 
 One will be a concept application question involving a political scenario.
 One will be a quantitative analysis and interpretation question with a visual stimulus.
One will be a SCOTUS Comparison, a comparison between two different supreme court cases.
 One will be an argumentation essay requiring supporting evidence and reasoning.

2019–2020 
 As a result of the COVID-19 pandemic, the College Board announced that AP exams may be taken from home. The exams are modified to only cover approximately the first 75% of the course. For most exams, the exam is 45 minutes long and consists of one or two free-response questions that can be submitted typed or handwritten. The exams are open note, open book, and open Internet.
 AP Computer Science A
 Topics such as abstract classes and interfaces have been removed.
 AP World History
 The course will now be split up into two different exams:
 AP World History: Modern - It will cover world history from the year 1200 CE to the present. 
 AP World History: Ancient - This course will be released at a later, unspecified date. 
 The Exam format will remain the same.

2020–2021 

 AP Comparative Government and Politics 
 Section I (Multiple Choice): The number of questions will remain the same at 55 questions, but time for the section will increase from 45 minutes to 60 minutes. It will continue to be worth 50% of the total exam score.
 Each question will now have 4 possible options instead of 5.
 There will be 2 text-based sources followed by a few questions.
 There will be 3 quantitative sources followed by a few questions.
 Section II (Free Response): The number of questions will decrease from 8 questions to 4 questions. The time will also decrease from 100 minutes to 90 minutes. It will continue to be worth 50% of the total exam score.
 Question 1: Conceptual Analysis
 Question 2: Quantitative Analysis
 Question 3: Comparative Analysis
 Question 4: Argument Essay
 AP Biology
 Section I (Multiple Choice): The number of questions will be reduced from 69 to 60 questions. Grid-in questions will no longer be on the exam.
 Section II (Free Response): The number of questions will be reduced from 8 to 6, but the time allocation for the section stays the same.
 The two long questions will both focus on "interpreting and evaluating experimental results".
 The section will have four short-answer questions. 
 AP English Language and Composition
 Section I (Multiple Choice): The number of questions will be reduced from 52–55 to 45.
 Section II (Free Response): The questions will now be scored with analytic rubrics.
 AP Human Geography
 Section I (Multiple Choice): The number of questions will be reduced from 75 to 60, with increased emphasis on analyzing quantitative and qualitative sources. The time allocation for the section remains the same. 
 Section II (Free Response): Each question will now be worth 7 points.
 AP Computer Science Principles
 The Explore Performance Task will be replaced with some multiple-choice questions, and the College Board will be releasing a new Create Task.
 AP Italian Language and Culture
 Section I (Multiple Choice): The 65 questions will now be split into two parts with nine sets total:
 Part A will have 30 questions and be 40 minutes long.
 Part B will have 35 questions and be 55 minutes long.

2021–2022 

AP Physics 1: Algebra-Based
Units 8-10 have been removed from the AP Physics 1 curriculum as they are covered in AP Physics 2. 
Kinematics, dynamics, circular motion and gravitation, energy, momentum, simple harmonic motion, and torque and rotational motion are still covered. However: electricity, magnetism, and sound have been removed.
AP Chemistry
Section I (Multiple Choice): Questions will now permit the use of a graphing calculator. The number and type of questions, as well as the section's time allocation remains the same.

Recent exam information

Below are statistics from the 2019 exam cycle showing the number of participants, the percentage who obtained a score of 3 or higher, and the mean score. Students generally need a score of 3 or higher to receive credit or benefit.

The College Board estimates that about 2/3 of students enrolled in an AP course take the course's AP test. On the other hand, a study of University of California system students found that only about 55% to 60% of AP students took their course's exam.

One 2014 study of math and science AP courses showed that participation rates were 52.7% for AP Chemistry, 53.6% for AP Physics, 57.7% for AP Biology, and 77.4% for AP Calculus. A 2017 study found similar participation rates (49.5% for AP Chemistry, 52.3% for AP Physics, 54.5% for Biology, and 68.9% for Calculus). History exams were found to have slightly higher participation rates (57.9% for AP European History, 58.5% for AP World History, and 62.8% for AP U.S. History), and 65.4% of AP English students took either the AP English Language or AP English Literature exam. This study found that for "core AP subjects (i.e., no arts or language subjects)", the overall test participation rate was 60.8%.

In February 2014 College Board released data from the previous ten years of AP exams. College Board found that 33.2% of public high school graduates from the class of 2013 had taken an AP exam, compared to 18.9% in 2003. In 2013 20.1% of graduates who had taken an AP test achieved a 3 or higher compared to 12.2% in 2003.

Criticism

Decreasing quality

Researchers began to question whether AP could maintain high academic standards while experiencing explosive growth. Research has shown that the most popular AP tests tend to have the lowest passing rates, a possible indication that less academically prepared students are enrolling in AP classes. Whether the AP program can serve large numbers of students without decreasing academic rigor is a matter of debate within the education field.

Passing scores and university credit
University faculty, such as former professor and high school teacher John Tierney, have expressed doubts about the value of a passing AP score. Students who receive scores of 3 or 4 are being given college credit at fewer universities. Academic departments also criticise the increasing proportion of students who take and pass AP courses but are not ready for college-level work.

Academic achievement
Researchers have since 2010 studied the impact of the Advanced Placement program on students' academic achievement. An early study published in AP: A critical examination of the Advanced Placement program found that students who took AP courses in the sciences but failed the AP exam performed no better in college science courses than students without any AP course at all. Referring to students who complete the course but fail the exam, the head researcher, Phillip M. Sadler, stated in an interview that "research shows that they don't appear to have learned anything during the year, so there is probably a better course for them".

Two other studies compared non-AP students with AP students who had not taken their course's AP exam, had taken the AP exam but did not pass it, or had passed the AP exam. Like Sadler's study, both found that AP students who passed their exam scored highest in other measures of academic achievement. The largest study of this sort, with a sample size of over 90,000, replicated these results and also showed that non-AP students performed with equal levels of academic achievement as AP students who did not take their course's AP exam—even after controlling for over 70 intervening variables. This led the authors to state that AP participation "... is not beneficial to students who merely enroll in the courses ...":p. 414

Some researchers have questioned the validity of Advance Placement scores or Advance Placement as an effective form of positive reinforcement. It is argued that the pursuit of extrinsic reward is not an accurate reflection of intrinsic interest in course material. Many other criteria should also be employed to judge a student including standardized test scores, research experience, breadth and the level of courses taken, and academic-related extracurriculars performance. Writing honors thesis or semi-independent research in a subject may be more signal of interest or academic potential than achieving the label of "Advance Placement" student. There are also questions on the effectiveness of separating high-achieving students from their peers, in the form of Advanced Placement courses.

See also 

Advanced Placement Awards
GCE Advanced Level
Education in Canada
Education in the United States
International Baccalaureate
2020 AP exams controversy

References

Further reading 
McCauley, David. 2007. The Impact of Advanced Placement and Dual Enrollment Program on College Graduation.
Applied Research Project. Texas State University. http://ecommons.txstate.edu/arp/206/
Schneider, Jack. 2008. Schools' Unrest Over the AP Test

External links

 AP Student website
 Score Distributions (most recent exam)

 
1955 establishments in the United States
1955 introductions
Canadian educational programs
United States educational programs
School qualifications
Gifted education
High school course levels
Phillips Exeter Academy
Phillips Academy
Princeton University
Yale University
Harvard University